101 Weddings is a 2012 Indian Malayalam-language romantic comedy film directed by Shafi and starring Kunchacko Boban, Jayasurya, Biju Menon, Samvrutha Sunil, and Bhama in the lead roles. The film is written by Kalavoor Ravikumar based on a story by the director. The film is produced by Shafi's brother Rafi Mecartin, Hasainar, and Shaleer, with audiography by M. R. Rajakrishnan under the banner of Film Folks and features music composed by Deepak Dev.

Plot

The movie opens up in the childhood pranks of  Krishnankutty, the son of famous Gandhian Munshi Shankara Pillai who is repeatedly beaten up by Antappan, his big schoolmate. Antappan is taking vengeance for the Gandhian deeds of Munshi who has closed down the toddy shop owned by Antappan's father. And when a chance comes up, Krishankutty retaliates by placing the costly golden church arrow in the bag of Antappan, which makes him a thief and lands him in a juvenile home for young criminals.

As they grow up, Krishnankutty becomes a TV producer in the name Krish but is ready to play fowl games and make money by little frauds. But his father Munshi who has now become a much proclaimed Gandhian finds an able girl in Abhirami, the only daughter of Abkari contractor Bhasi, to reform his son.

Abhirami and Co who is running the Kasturba Society are on the plans to hold a mass wedding of 101 couples in which she will also find a suitable groom and marry. The mass wedding is arranged in such a way that the interested persons are needed to stay in the picturesque resort-like village for two weeks to get familiar with their probable future partners. Krish is but reluctant to marry another girl with Gandhian principles and brings in Jyothish Kumar a.k.a. Jyothi, a dance teacher with all female mannerisms, gets him registered as Krishanankutty to make Abhirami move away from this alliance. Antappan and his gang who has now grown up as famous quotation gangs also register for the marriage in the plans to grab the money and 5 gold coins that are given to each couple. And as the day to the marriage comes up, more and more persons enroll into the mass wedding with their own interesting plans.

Cast

Production

Shooting started on 15 July 2012 at Kochi, the other locations are Thodupuzha, Ottappalam and Hyderabad.

Soundtrack

The soundtrack was composed by Deepak Dev, with lyrics penned by Rafeeq Ahmed. The album consists of four songs. The audio rights of the film were acquired by Manorama Music. The album was launched on 28 October 2012 at Kochi.

Box office
The film collected  from the UK box office.

References

External links
 

2012 films
2010s Malayalam-language films
Indian romantic comedy films
Films shot in Kochi
Films shot in Ottapalam
Films shot in Telangana
2012 romantic comedy films
Films directed by Shafi